Sri Lanka competed in the first ever  South Asian Winter Games held in Dehradun and Auli, India from 10 January to 16 January 2011. It sent only one athlete, Anita Rollin who won gold in snow boarding.

Medals Table

References

2011 in Sri Lankan sport
Sri Lanka at the South Asian Winter Games